Emporia grisescens is a species of snout moth in the genus Emporia. It was described by Ragonot in 1887. It is found in Tunisia.

References

Moths described in 1887
Phycitinae
Endemic fauna of Tunisia
Moths of Africa